Columbia Airport may refer to:

 Columbia Airport (California) in Columbia, California, United States (FAA: O22)
 Columbia Airport (Louisiana) in Columbia, Louisiana, United States (FAA: F86)
 Columbia Airport (Ohio) in Columbia Township, Lorain County, Ohio, United States (FAA: 4G8)
 Columbia County Airport in Columbia County, New York State, United States (FAA: 1B1)
 Columbia Metropolitan Airport in Columbia, South Carolina, United States (FAA: CAE)
 Columbia Owens Downtown Airport in Columbia, South Carolina, United States (FAA: CUB)
 Columbia Regional Airport near Columbia, Missouri, United States (IATA: COU)
 Columbia Field, a former airport in Valley Stream, New York originally known as Advance Sunrise Airport / Curtiss Airfield.

See also
 Columbiana County Airport in East Liverpool, Ohio, United States (FAA: 02G)
 List of airports in Colombia (South America)
 List of airports in British Columbia (Canada)